Peter Ridgway (born 23 April 1949) is an Australian modern pentathlete. He competed at the 1976 Summer Olympics, finishing in 42nd place.

References

External links
 

1949 births
Living people
Australian male modern pentathletes
Olympic modern pentathletes of Australia
Modern pentathletes at the 1976 Summer Olympics
20th-century Australian people
21st-century Australian people